Laurie may refer to:

Places
 Laurie, Cantal, France, a commune
 Laurie, Missouri, United States, a village
 Laurie Island, Antarctica

Music
 Laurie Records, a record label
 Laurie (EP), a 1992 album by Daniel Johnston
 "Laurie (Strange Things Happen)", a 1965 tragic ballad by Dickey Lee

People and fictional characters
 Laurie (surname)
 Laurie (given name), a list of people and fictional characters

Other uses
 Laurie baronets, three titles, one in the Baronetage of Nova Scotia and two in the Baronetage of the United Kingdom
 Tillandsia 'Laurie', a hybrid cultivar of Tillandsia schiedeana
 "Laurie" (short story), a 2018 short story by Stephen King

See also 
 Lawrie
 Lauri (disambiguation)
 Lauria (disambiguation)
 Lori
 Lorrie
 Lourie
 Lurie